Koldan may refer to:
 Koldan, Baft, Kerman Province
 Koldan, Jiroft, Kerman Province
 Koldan, Rabor, Kerman Province
 Koldan, Sistan and Baluchestan